Percival Kofi Akpaloo is a Ghanaian politician. He is the leader of the Liberal Party of Ghana. He was also the party's presidential candidate for the 2020 Ghanaian general election.

Politics

Independent People's Party
Akpaloo founded the Independent People's Party (IPP) in 2011. He was the leader of the party when it contested the 2012 Ghanaian general election but won no seats. He was disqualified from contesting the 2016 Ghanaian general election as the presidential candidate of the party by the Electoral Commission of Ghana, a decision he unsuccessfully contested in court.

Liberal Party of Ghana
Akpaloo dissolved the IPP and formed the Liberal Party of Ghana in its stead in March 2017. He was selected by the party to stand as its presidential candidate in the 2020 Ghanaian general election on 7 December 2020. Margaret Obrian Sarfo was chosen as his running mate

Personal life
Akpaloo once suggested that his parents misused him without specifying the details of what he meant by that. He was discussing hawking by children at the time.

See also
Liberal Party of Ghana

References

External links 

Year of birth missing (living people)
Living people
Candidates for President of Ghana